The women's 3000 metres relay at the 2003 Asian Winter Games was held on February 7, 2003 at Misawa Ice Arena, Japan.

Schedule
All times are Japan Standard Time (UTC+09:00)

Results
Legend
DNF — Did not finish

References

Start list

External links
Official website

Women Relay